HEART 103.2 may refer to:
 Heart North West in Kendal, Cumbria
 Hope 103.2 in New South Wales